Jeo Tupas Santisima (born 28 May 1996) is a Filipino professional boxer who challenged for the WBO super-bantamweight title in February 2020.

Professional career
Santisima defeated Rene Dacquel in four rounds.  This set up a world title opportunity for Santisima.

Santisima challenged Emanuel Navarrete for the WBO junior featherweight world title, where he lost by technical knockout in his first knockout loss.  This fight was on the Deontay Wilder vs. Tyson Fury II Pay Per View undercard and was Santisima's first fight in the United States.

References

Living people
1996 births
People from Masbate
Filipino male boxers
Super-bantamweight boxers
Featherweight boxers